Golbahar County is in Razavi Khorasan province, Iran. The capital of the county is the city of Golbahar. At the 2006 census, the region's population (as Golbajar District of Chenaran County) was 34,556 in 8,800 households. The following census in 2011 counted 40,785 people in 11,969 households. At the 2016 census, the district's population was 66,321 in 20,164 households. Golbajar District was separated from Chenaran County on 17 November 2019 to form Golbahar County.

Administrative divisions

The population history and structural changes of Golbahar County's administrative divisions (as Golbajar District of Chenaran County) over three consecutive censuses are shown in the following table.

References

Counties of Razavi Khorasan Province

fa:شهرستان گلبهار